Ya'akov Jacques Amir (15 March 1933 – 31 March 2011) was an Israeli politician who served as a member of the Knesset for the Alignment between 1974 and 1988.

Biography
Born Jacques Amzalag in Essaouira in Morocco, Amir was educated in a vocational high school in Casablanca and was a member of the Pioneer youth movement. His father was Yitzhak-Chaim Amzalag. In 1952, he made aliyah to Israel, where he joined kibbutz Ein Gev and the Ahdut HaAvoda party. His first name, Jacques, was accidentally hebraized in Yaakov due to the error of an official at the Haifa port. The following year he moved to kibbutz Ginosar, where he lived until moving to Dimona in 1958. From 1959 until 1974, he worked at the Dead Sea Works, becoming senior foreman of the metal section, and first secretary and chairman of the workers council. He also served on Dimona Workers Council between 1959 and 1964 and as a member of the Histadrut executive committee from 1965 until 1973.

In 1965, he became deputy mayor of Dimona, serving until 1968, and again from 1973 until 1976. He won a place on the Alignment list (an alliance of the Labor Party (which Ahdut HaAvoda had merged into in 1968) and Mapam) for the 1973 Knesset elections, but failed to win a seat. However, he entered the Knesset on 10 June 1974 as a replacement for former Prime Minister Golda Meir. He was re-elected in 1977, and the following year became mayor of Dimona, a post he held until 1984. He was re-elected to the Knesset again in 1981 and 1984, before losing his seat in the 1988 elections.

Outside politics, Amir was also a member of the world presidium of the Sephardi Federation and in 1986 was appointed chairman of the Israeli Alcoholism Prevention Society.

References

External links

1933 births
2011 deaths
Alignment (Israel) politicians
Deputy mayors of places in Israel
Israeli trade unionists
Jewish Israeli politicians
Members of the 8th Knesset (1974–1977)
Members of the 9th Knesset (1977–1981)
Members of the 10th Knesset (1981–1984)
Members of the 11th Knesset (1984–1988)
Moroccan emigrants to Israel
20th-century Moroccan Jews
People from Essaouira
Politicians from Dimona
Mayors of places in Israel